Colin Clarke (born 4 April 1946) is a Scottish former professional football player and manager. Clarke, who played as a central defender, spent the majority of his career in England – minus a one-season stint in the North American Soccer League – and made nearly 500 career league appearances.

Career
Born in Glasgow, Clarke began his career in his native Scotland with Arthurlie, before moving to English giants Arsenal in 1963. Clarke never made a league appearance for Arsenal, and later played for Oxford United, the Los Angeles Aztecs, and Plymouth Argyle before becoming player-manager of Kettering Town.

Coaching career
Clarke spent three years in charge of Kettering Town. In July 1991, Clarke became assistant manager at Lincoln City. After six months in the role, the club activated a contractual clause to cancel his two-year contract following his failure to relocate his home to Lincoln as agreed. In July 1992 he became youth development officer at Reading but lasted just four months before departing with the Royals youth team bottom of the South East Counties League Division Two. He was then appointed youth team coach at Aston Villa in February 1993.

In 2003 he was appointed assistant head men's soccer coach at the University of Tulsa. He was named both the 2009 NSCAA Midwest Region Assistant Coach of the Year, and the 2009 National Soccer Coaches Association of America Assistant Coach of the Year. After nine seasons at Tulsa, the conclusion of the 2011 season saw Clarke announce his retirement from coaching.

Honours

Oxford United
Third Division – Winner 1968

References

External links
 
 NASL career stats

1946 births
Living people
Scottish footballers
Arthurlie F.C. players
Arsenal F.C. players
Oxford United F.C. players
Los Angeles Aztecs players
Plymouth Argyle F.C. players
Kettering Town F.C. players
English Football League players
North American Soccer League (1968–1984) players
Scottish football managers
Kettering Town F.C. managers
Corby Town F.C. managers
Stafford Rangers F.C. managers
Lincoln City F.C. non-playing staff
Association football central defenders
Scottish expatriate sportspeople in the United States
Expatriate soccer players in the United States
Scottish expatriate footballers
Reading F.C. non-playing staff
Aston Villa F.C. non-playing staff